Vera is a municipality of Almería province, in the autonomous community of Andalusia, Spain. Today Vera is one of the most important commercial centres in the region, with a thriving traditional core and a number of supermarkets and commercial organisations spread along the ring road. There, a tourist settlement, named Vera Playa, has been developed. This now forms the main economic activity of Vera. Since 1990, Vera Playa has developed into an important naturist village.

History
The earliest Carthaginian, Roman and Moorish settlement was at Baria, by the sea near Villaricos. But in the unsettled times of the early Middle Ages, the settlement was moved inland to the hill of Espiritu Santo, but an earthquake destroyed it in 1518. Following the earthquake it was rebuilt on the site it currently occupies, as a rectangular layout with eight towers and two gates. At the centre was the Parish Church of the Encarnación, built as a fortress to protect the village against pirates. In the late 19th century the town expanded due to mining activity in the region, but it subsequently declined until its recent development as a tourist centre.

Demographics

Vera Playa 

Vera also has a long and wide beach with a large number of chiringuitos. There are many new neighborhoods in construction and the population is growing. The weather is good all year long, and the area receives many holiday-makers. Vera Playa has a different postal code: 04621.

Naturism

The north of Vera Playa is known for its naturist area, one of the largest in Europe, with accommodation and nightlife. Since 1990, Vera Playa has developed into an important centre for naturism (nudism). There are several apartment complexes, including Natsun, La Manera, Bahia de Vera and Vera Natura, where naturism is officially permitted. The naturist complex is completely open and there are good parking facilities. About  of beach have been reserved for naturists. The area of Vera Playa is a well known naturist area and includes one of Spain's naturist hotels (Vera Playa Club Hotel).

On 21 July 2013 a local group called Vera Playa Friends organised a Guinness World Record attempt at the largest ever skinny dip. 729 naturists entered the sea at El Playazo beach at 12:00 noon beating the previous record of 506 set in New Zealand the previous year. Vera Mayor José Carmelo Jorge called the mass nude swim a "tremendous success". The event was organised by Vera Playa Friends in association with Vera Town hall and Tourist Office, also heavily involved were the Spanish Naturist Federation and the day chosen was the "day without swimsuits" with hundreds of Spanish naturists flocking to the beach . A local charity for children suffering from disabilities benefited from the Guinness World Record crowds .

Notes and references

External links 

  Vera – Sistema de Información Multiterritorial de Andalucía
  Vera – Diputación Provincial de Almería
  Vera – Información sobre Vera]
  Vera – Ayuntamiento de Vera]

Municipalities in the Province of Almería
Naturist resorts
Naturism in Spain
Nude beaches
Populated coastal places in Spain